The Tasmanian Football Hall of Fame was established to help recognise outstanding services and overall contribution made to the sport of Australian rules football in Tasmania. Any participant of the sport, including players, umpires, media personalities and coaches, may be inducted. A physical hall was established in 2005 after the Tasmanian Community Fund provided a $50,000 grant to assist AFL Tasmania and the Launceston City Council with establishment of a permanent facility at York Park. The decision to locate the Hall of Fame at the ground was because the site had recently been redeveloped and was positioned as the "true home of Tasmanian football". AFL Tasmania initiated the Hall of Fame nomination process, with a number of clubs, players and grounds nominated and accepted into the Hall of Fame since 2005. The public Hall of Fame opened to the public on Saturday 21 February 2009.

The induction criteria were expanded in 2007, allowing "The Gravel" Oval of Queenstown to be honoured.

Other inductees have included Roy Cazaly, Paul Sproule, Verdun Howell, Paul Williams, Brent Crosswell and the Smithton 'Saints' Football Club.

2005 – Inductees
The 'Icons' of Tasmanian Football are listed in bold

 Gordon Abbott
 Matthew Armstrong
 Noel Atkins
 Jim Atkinson
 Roy Bailey
 Darrel Baldock
 Vic Barwick
 Bill Berryman
 John Bingley
 Hugh Cameron
 Bruce Carter
 Terry Cashion
 Roy Cazaly
 George Challis
 Jack Charlesworth
 John Chick
 Bert Chilcott 
 Don Clark
 Scott Clayton
 Neil Conlan
 Jock Connell
 Roy Cooper
 Berkley Cox
 Daryn Cresswell
 Brent Crosswell
 Peter Daniel
 Craig Davis
 Col Deane
 John Devine
 Jack Donnelly
 Ian Drake
 Jack Dunn
 Brian Eade
 Rodney Eade
 Darrell Eaton
 Steven Febey
 Terry Fellows
 Bill Fielding
 Adrian Fletcher
 Peter Floyd
 Brendon Gale
 Don Gale
 Michael Gale
 Jack Gardiner
 Rex Garwood
 Horrie Gorringe
 David Grant
 Graeme Hamley
 Royce Hart
 Pat Hartnett
 Jack Hawksley
 Jack Hill
 Arthur Hodgson
 Verdun Howell
 Paul Hudson
 Peter Hudson
 Eric Huxtable
 Des James
 Tassie Johnson
 Peter Jones
 Tim Lane
 Barry Lawrence
 Noel Leary
 Graeme Lee
 John Leedham
 Allan Leeson
 Allan Leitch
 Trevor Leo
 Greg Lethborg
 Danny Ling
 Geoff Long
 Harry Long
 Brian Lowe
 Gavin Luttrell
 Alastair Lynch 
 Les Manson
 Peter Marquis
 Paddy Martin
 Horrie Mason
 Leo McAuley
 Fred McGinis
 Kevin McLean
 Jack McMurray, Jr.
 Stephen MacPherson
 Jack Metherell
 Bob Miller
 George Miller
 Colin Moore
 Laurie Nash
 Robert Neal
 Gavin O'Dea
 Ian Paton
 Burnie Payne
 Geoff Poulter
 Fred Pringle
 Darrin Pritchard
 Len Pye
 Vern Rae
 Alan Rait
 Trevor Ranson
 Matthew Richardson
 Michael Roach
 Colin Robertson
 Jim Ross
 Jack Rough
 Alan Scott
 Don Scott
 Lerrel Sharp
 Robert Shaw
 Fred Smith
 Hec Smith
 Ricky Smith
 Stuart Spencer
 Paul Sproule
 Ian Stewart
 Barry Strange
 Raynor 'Rattler' Summers
 Darryl Sutton
 Algy Tynan
 Viv Valentine
 George Viney
 Paddy Walsh
 Peter Walsh
 Ivor Warne-Smith
 Keith Welsh
 Paul Williams
 Greg Wilson
 Bob Withers
 Graeme Wright
 Eric Zschech

2006 – Inductees

 Simon Atkins
 Bill Atwell
 Doug Barwick
 Ray Biffin
 Chris Bond
 Noel Clarke
 Garry Davidson
 Keith Dickenson
 John Fitzallen
 Jack Hinds
 Graham Hunnibell
 Nigel Hyland
 Joe Littler
 Ellis Maney
 Tony Martyn
 Ernie Matthews
 Warren McCarthy  
 David McQuestin
 Kerry O'Neill
 Bob Parsons
 Neil Rawson
 Noel Reid
 Graeme Saltmarsh
 Garth Smith
 Ray Stokes
 Ted Turner
 Ronald Tyson
 Scott Wade
 Athol Webb
 Ian Westell
 Jim 'Dodger' Williams
 Tony 'Chang' Young

2007 – Inductees

 Ken Austin
 Andy Bennett
 Max Brown
 Noel Carter
 Dale Chugg
 Athol Cooper
 Chris Fagan
 Martin Flanagan
 Wayne Fox
 Les Fyle
 John Greening
 Ivan Hayes
 Len Hayes
 Scott Jeffery
 Steane Kremerskothen
 William Leitch
 Gary Linton
 James Manson
 Danny Noonan
 Wally Ride
 Roy Ringrose
 Jamie Shanahan
 David Stockdale
 George Vautin
 Royce Viney
 Graeme Wilkinson

2008 – Inductees

 Ben Atkin
 Kevin Bailey
 John Bonney
 Colin Campbell
 Lance Crosswell
 Harold Dowling
 Robbie Dykes
 Tim Evans
 Steve Goulding
 Ron Hall
 Les Hepper
 Nathan Howard
 Ray James
 Andy Lovell
 Graeme Mackey
 Neil Maynard
 Don McLeod
 Keith Roberts
 Graeme Shephard
 Col Stokes
 Charlie Thompson
 Darren Trevena
 Kevin Williams
 Mark Williams

2009 – Inductees

 Grant Allford
 Bob Beakley
 Gordon Bowman
 Stephen Carey
 Harry Coventry
 Gary Dawson
 Mike Delanty
 Grant Fagan
 Matthew Febey
 Des Graham 
 Michael Hunnibell
 David Langmaid 
 Wendell Langmaid
 Tom Lee
 Jim Manson
 John McCarthy
 Chris Reynolds
 Hedley Rooke
 Roger Steele
 Kevin Symons
 Gary Williamson
 Darren Winter

2010 – Inductees

 Fred Davies
 Kerry Good
 Brad Green
 Ray Groom
 Ricky Hanlon
 Brady Rawlings
 Chris Riewoldt
 Russell Robertson
 Peter Sharp
 Michael Styles
 Hedley Thompson
 Albert Waddle

2011 – Inductees

 Steve Beaumont
 Gavin Cooney
 Graham Fox
 Max Griffiths
 Ben Harrison
 Len Lewis
 Harry McDonald
 Simon Minton-Connell
 Trent Nichols
 Tony Pickett
 Lindsay Webb
 Wayne Wing

2012 – Inductees

 Paul Vinar
 Roger Browning
 Derek Peardon
 Rod Butler
 Ian Marsh
 Peter Johnston
 Mark "Bill" Williams
 Peter Roozendaal
 Darryn Perry
 Jade Rawlings

2013 – Inductees

 Trent Bartlett
 Geoff Hill
 Jamie Dennis
 Bill Sorell
 Wayne Youd
 John Heathcote
 Leigh McConnon
 Tony Maguire
 Brodie Holland
 Chris Jones

2014 – Inductees

 Ron Marney
 Vern O'Byrne
 Kevin King
 Barry Walker
 Tony Browning
 Stephen Nichols
 Peter King
 Cameron Clayton
 John Klug
 Daniel Hulm

2015 – Inductees

 Harold 'Nunky' Ayers
 Mal Pascoe
 Roy Apted
 Jim Leitch
 Kerry Doran
 Andrew Vanderfeen
 Roland Curley
 Dion Scott
 Scott McCallum
 Ben Beams

2016 – Inductees

 Trevor Best
 Ken Lette
 Terry Morris
 Michael Seddon
 David Noble
 Robert Groenewegen
 Nick Probert
 Brendon Bolton
 Ian Callinan
 Grant Birchall

2018 – Inductees

 Vic Belcher
 Greg Moline
 Vic Castles
 Maurie Sankey
 Dennis Powell
 Athol Hodgetts
 Bill Trethewie
 Mitch Lefevre
 Luke Crane
 Jack Riewoldt

See also
 Queenstown Oval, Tasmania

References

Hall
Australian rules football museums and halls of fame
Halls of fame in Tasmania